is a Japanese professional shogi player ranked 5-dan.

Early life
Kadokura was born in Toshima, Tokyo on June 3, 1987. He learned shogi when he was a third-grade elementary school student from an acquaintance who was a strong amateur player.

Kadokura entered the Japan Shogi Association's apprentice school as a student of shogi professional  at the rank of 5-kyū in 2000. He was promoted to 1-dan in 2003 and 3-dan in 2005. It took him eleven seasons of 3-dan League play before he obtained full professional status and the rank of 4-dan after tying for first place in the 48th 3-dan League (October 2010March 2011) in 2011 with a record of 13 wins and 5 losses.

Shogi professional
In August 2019, Kadokura defeated Junpei Ide to win the 4th . It was Kadokura's first tournament championship as a professional.

Promotion history
Kadokura's promotion history is as follows:

 6-kyū: September 2000
 3-dan: October 2005 
 4-dan: April 1, 2011 
 5-dan: November 17, 2016

References

External links
ShogiHub: Professional Player Info · Kadokura, Keita

Japanese shogi players
Living people
Professional shogi players
Professional shogi players from Tokyo
1987 births
People from Toshima